Futuro Antico (Ancient Future) is a pioneering World Music group comprising Walter Maioli (after the demise of the group Aktuala) with Riccardo Sinigaglia (a keyboardist and theoretician in musical intonations) and Gabin Dabiré (a singer, guitar player, and composer from Burkina Faso). The aim of the project is D'ai primitivi all'elettronica, and they recruited a number of musicians from India and Africa for the recording. The project is considered by the participants to be open-ended.

Discography 
Futuro Antico (1980)
Dai primitivi all'elettronica (1980)
Intonazioni Archetipe (2005)

References

External links 
 Maioli's page dedicated to Futuro Antico
 Prog Archives page for group

Italian world music groups